Lansdowne station is a SEPTA railway station in Lansdowne, Pennsylvania. It serves the Media/Wawa Line. The station was originally built in 1880 by the Pennsylvania Railroad.  In 2013, this station saw 313 boardings and 394 alightings on an average weekday. It is located at Scottdale Road & South Lansdowne Avenue, Lansdowne, PA 19050 and has an 89-car parking lot.

Station layout
Lansdowne has two low-level side platforms.

References

External links
SEPTA – Lansdowne Station
Lansdowne Avenue entrance from Google Maps Street View

SEPTA Regional Rail stations
Stations on the West Chester Line
Former Pennsylvania Railroad stations
Railway stations in the United States opened in 1880
1880 establishments in Pennsylvania